William LeBaron Putnam (May 26, 1835 – February 5, 1918) was a lawyer and politician in Maine. Putnam served as mayor of Portland, Maine from 1869–70 and later served as a United States circuit judge of the United States Court of Appeals for the First Circuit and of the United States Circuit Courts for the First Circuit.

Education and career
Born in Bath, Maine, Putnam received an Artium Baccalaureus degree from Bowdoin College in 1855, where he was a member of the Peucinian Society. He read law in 1858 to be admitted to the Maine Bar. He worked as a lawyer in private practice in Portland, Maine from 1858 to 1891. Putnam served as a city council member in Portland from 1860 to 1861, a member of the board of aldermen in 1862, and as Mayor of Portland from 1869 to 1870. He was a commissioner to negotiate American fishing rights in Canada from 1887 to 1888.

Federal judicial service
Putnam was nominated by President Benjamin Harrison on December 16, 1891, to the United States Court of Appeals for the First Circuit and the United States Circuit Courts for the First Circuit, to a new joint seat authorized by 26 Stat. 826. He was confirmed by the United States Senate on March 17, 1892, and received his commission the same day. On December 31, 1911, the Circuit Courts were abolished and he thereafter served only on the Court of Appeals. His service terminated on September 17, 1917, due to his retirement.

Death
Putnam died on February 5, 1918, in Portland.

References

Sources
 

Judges of the United States Court of Appeals for the First Circuit
1835 births
1918 deaths
Maine lawyers
Bowdoin College alumni
Mayors of Portland, Maine
People from Bath, Maine
United States federal judges appointed by Benjamin Harrison
19th-century American judges
Portland, Maine City Council members
19th-century American politicians
United States federal judges admitted to the practice of law by reading law